Succession to Peerages Bill may refer to:

Succession to Peerages Bill (2016-2017)
Succession to Peerages Bill (2015-2016)